The SS Princess Louise was a 331-foot steamship, named in honor of Louise, Princess Royal and Duchess of Fife, Queen Victoria's granddaughter. The ship was part of the Canadian Pacific Railway's "Princess" fleet, the coastal counterparts to CPR's "Empress" fleet of passenger liners which sailed on trans-Pacific and trans-Atlantic routes.  The ships of the British Columbia Coast Steamships came to be called "pocket liners" because they offered on smaller vessels the superior class of service, splendid amenities and luxurious decor equal to great ocean liners.

Design and construction
Princess Louise was built in 1921, North Vancouver, B.C., for the tourist service to Alaska run by British Columbia Coast Steamships (BCCS). She was considered to be a luxury cruise ship of the era.

Operations
For BCCS, Princess Louise carried passengers on the 1,750-mile round-trip voyage between Vancouver and Alaska until she was removed from service in 1964.

Transfer of ownership
Purchased by Jerry Sutton, Princess Louise was moved to a permanent berth on Terminal Island in Los Angeles Harbor. She opened for business on September 25, 1966, as the largest floating restaurant in America, and was initially successful, drawing in nearly 2,000 guests per day. In 1979, she was towed to a new location at Berth 94 in San Pedro. By 1984, the restaurant was losing money, and was sold to Marion Perkov, who failed to save the business and filed for bankruptcy four years later.

The SS Princess Louise forever closed her restaurant doors on January 15, 1989. The Bank of San Pedro seized the vessel, and had her repaired and made ready for resale, when on October 30, 1989, the ship capsized at her berth. Lloyd's of London, the ship's insurers, suspected foul play, and refused to distribute the insured value to the beneficiaries.

Fate
It was finally decided that Princess Louise would be sunk in 500 feet of water near Catalina Island as an artificial reef. However, while being towed toward Catalina on the morning of June 20, 1990, the ship took on water and sank prematurely in 900 feet of water.

Notes

Steamships of Canada
Canadian Pacific Railway
Ships built in British Columbia
1921 ships
Steamboats of Washington (state)
Passenger ships of Canada
Ships of CP Ships